Tetragonoderus interruptus is a species of beetle in the family Carabidae. It was described by Pierre François Marie Auguste Dejean in 1829.

References

interruptus
Beetles described in 1829